The Mondello Prize (Italian: Premio Mondello or Premio letterario internazionale Mondello Città di Palermo) is an Italian literary award established in 1975.

History
The award was founded by a group of Palermo intellectuals and academics, and was first directed by the magistrate Francesco Lentini until his death in 2000. Since it is organized by a cultural foundation, . 

Since 2012 the award has a partnership with the Turin International Book Fair. The same year it established an award for young writers, the Mondello Giovani Award. 

Winners include Cees Nooteboom in 2017.

References

Further reading

External links 

1975 establishments in Italy
Awards established in 1975
Italian literary awards
Prize